Matt Simons (born February 20, 1987) is an American singer-songwriter based in Brooklyn, New York City. Self-releasing his first EP Living Proof in 2012, he has since gone on to release two full-length albums globally, achieving chart success across Europe, South Africa, and the Americas.

Personal life 
Matt Simons was born and brought up in Palo Alto, California . Hailing from a musical family, his grandparents were both opera singers in Los Angeles. Having played the saxophone from an early age, he got a degree in jazz saxophone performance at the Purchase College Conservatory, as well as learning to play on piano, switching to clarinet, guitar, and saxophone, eventually settling back on piano.

Career 
He released his first EP Living Proof in 2010 and spent 2011 touring the United States and Europe, including the UK, Germany and the Netherlands. He usually plays piano and keyboards while singing. He also plays the saxophone, included improvised solos on the track "Fall in Line" and in live performances of "I'm Already Over You".

He released his debut album Pieces on 19 June 2012, "Gone" being his debut single. The 10-track album with 9 being his own compositions was produced by Nashville producer and sound engineer Stephen Goose by David.

Simons gained fame in the Netherlands after his rendition of "With You" taken from his album Pieces was picked as one of the theme songs on the Dutch soap television series Goede Tijden, Slechte Tijden. The song reached No. 8 on the Dutch Single Top 100 chart and also peaked at No. 8 in the Dutch Top 40 chart. It was also picked as Mega Hit by the Dutch radio station 3FM in January 2013. As a result the album Pieces also appeared on the Dutch Albums Top 100 chart.

His greatest commercial success came with "Catch & Release" title track from his similarly titled album Catch & Release, released in 2014. Originally it became a hit in the Netherlands and Spain as it appeared on the album, but the song saw even further success when it was remixed in 2015 by Dutch house duo producers Deepend, charting as "Catch & Release (Deepend Remix)" across Europe, reaching number 1 in Spain, Belgium, Germany and France, as well as reaching gold status Norway, Portugal, France, Canada, South Africa, and Austria, and platinum status in Belgium, Italy, Germany, Netherlands, Ireland, Spain, Sweden and Switzerland.

In 2018, he returned with the single "We Can Do Better", released April 4, and announced more music and his third album to be released later in the year.

Discography

Albums

Extended plays

Singles

As lead artist

As featured artist

Notes

Filmography
2012: Goede tijden, slechte tijden (theme song "With You")

References

External links

1987 births
Living people
American male singer-songwriters
Musicians from Palo Alto, California
Singer-songwriters from California
21st-century American singers
21st-century American male singers